Eupithecia kruusi is a moth in the family Geometridae. It is found in Turkmenistan.

References

Moths described in 1988
kruusi
Moths of Asia